The Shakers: Hands to Work, Hearts to God  is a 1984 documentary film by Ken Burns.

Summary
Narrated by David McCullough, this hour-long documentary  features interviews with several living Shakers and with historians and philosophers.

Inspiration
Ken Burns has said that he chose the topic of the Shakers in large part because his first project, the Oscar-nominated Brooklyn Bridge, was devoted to urban American history; Shakerism offered him an opportunity to explore rural American history.

Availability
It was released part of Ken Burns' America DVD set on September 28, 2004.

References

External links
 The Shakers on PBS
 The Shakers on IMDb
 The Shakers on WHYY-TV

1984 films
Films directed by Ken Burns
American documentary films
Documentary films about Christianity in the United States
The
1984 documentary films
1980s American films